"Equinox" is a minor blues jazz standard by American jazz saxophone player and composer John Coltrane. Originally released on Coltrane's Sound played in C# minor with a slow swing feel. However, it is usually played in the key of C Minor and often covered on the flute.

Name
Coltrane’s wife Naima named the song "Equinox". The equinox occur twice a year, when the tilt of the Earth’s axis is inclined neither away from nor towards the sun. John Coltrane was born on September 23, 1926, the day of  the official autumn equinox of that year. 

The release of "Equinox" was delayed until 1964 when Atlantic issued the album Coltrane’s Sound. Before he recorded it, Coltrane performed "Equinox" several times in live venues, including a session with Miles Davis’ rhythm section and at the 1960 Monterey Jazz Festival. Unfortunately, the other Atlantic recordings of "Equinox" were lost in the 1978 warehouse fire before they were released. Unlike "Naima" and "My Favorite Things", "Equinox" would not become part of Coltrane's repertoire.

Coltrane's attitude in writing "Equinox" is described by Dr Lewis Porter as "Coltrane was a serious blues player and his blues pieces reflect the desire to get back to a primal mood, and away from the emotionally lighter, harmonically more complicated and complex blues of the boppers."

The original recording

"Equinox" is introduced by McCoy Tyner and Elvin Jones with a Latin rhythmic passage which shifts into the slower tempo of the theme. The composition evokes a sense of mystery. Coltrane then enters on the horn (a tenor), his playing slow and pensive. The theme is repeated for two choruses and then stating the theme twice. He then proceeds with an improvisation of unusual  emotional depth - reminiscent of a preacher exhorting his congregation. Elvin Jones make dramatic use of drum rolls and cymbal crashes throughout the song to maintain the sense of mystery. McCoy Tyner comps with a  light feel.

Form & Lead Sheet for Equinox
"Equinox" is a 12 bar minor blues with a fourteen bar introduction. The head is played twice before and after the solos.

Covers
"Equinox" has been covered by:
Larry Coryell, John Scofield and Joe Beck on album Tributaries (Novus Records, 1979).
Gerald Wilson Orchestra on album Eternal Equinox (Pacific Jazz Records, 1969).
Rhoda Scott on live recording Rhoda Scott - Live at the Olympia (1972).
Hubert Laws on album Wild Flower (1972).
Pharoah Sanders on album Oh Lord, Let Me Do No Wrong (1987).
Dave Valentin on album Primitive Passions (1996).
Liquid Soul on album Liquid Soul (1996).
Jessica Williams on album Equinox (2007).
Clutch on album Slow Hole to China: Rare and Unreleased (2009).
Ronnie Earl (guitar) on albums Still River (1993) and Just For Today (2013).
Eddie Daniels on album "Nepenthe" (GRP, 1990)

References 

1964 compositions
Compositions by John Coltrane
Instrumentals
1960s jazz standards
Jazz compositions in C-sharp minor